Femke Kok (born 5 October 2000) is a Dutch speed skater who is specialized in the sprint distances.

Career
Kok became junior world champion at the 2019 World Junior Speed Skating Championships in February 2019 in Baselga di Pinè, Italy. In December 2019 Kok finished third at the 500m at the Dutch Single Distance Championships which qualified her for the European and World Single Distances Speed Skating Championships.

Records

Personal records

World records

Tournament overview

Source:

World Cup overview

Medals won

References

External links
 
 

2000 births
Living people
Dutch female speed skaters
Sportspeople from Friesland
World Single Distances Speed Skating Championships medalists
Speed skaters at the 2022 Winter Olympics
Olympic speed skaters of the Netherlands
World Sprint Speed Skating Championships medalists
21st-century Dutch women